Jorquera is a caldera in Chile,  southeast of Copiapo.

The caldera is filled with breccia and several ignimbrite and lava layers, up to several  of thickness. These ignimbrites radiating away from the centre of the caldera are formed from welded lithic-rich dacite.

The later lava domes are of trachydacitic-rhyolitic composition. Southeast of Jorquera lies the Carrizalillo caldera.

The formation of the caldera is linked to the geological history of the Copiapo ranges. After Cretaceous-Paleogene episodes of rifting during the Paleocene-Eocene caldera and stratovolcano occurred. The caldera itself is constructed on top of various sedimentary and volcanic formations dating back to the Jurassic but also including late Mesozoic and Tertiary rocks.

References 

Paleocene calderas
Eocene calderas
Calderas of Chile
Volcanoes of Atacama Region